Tasmanicosa godeffroyi, one of the wolf spiders, is a mid sized spider found in some states of Australia (QLD, NSW and VIC). Perhaps the most commonly noticed of the wolf spiders in Australia. Variable in pattern and colour, though the underside of the abdomen is black. Wolf spiders tend to rest at the entrance of their burrows, and their eyes reflect the light of passing cars or torchlight. The burrow has a thin veil of silk, without a lid, unlike some other wolf spiders. 
The burrow is circular in cross section, it travels down for around 15 cm, then parallel with the ground for the next 15 cm. The body length of the female is up to 27 mm, the male 25 mm.

See also 
 List of Lycosidae species

References

Lycosidae
Spiders of Australia
Spiders described in 1865